SH2 domain-containing protein 3A is a protein that in humans is encoded by the SH2D3A gene. The protein may be useful in Western Blots and ELISAs.

Interactions 

SH2D3A has been shown to interact with the epidermal growth factor receptor. The gene may play a role in JNK activation.

References

Further reading

External links